The Global Dow (GDOW) is a 150-stock index of corporations from around the world, created by Dow Jones & Company. Only blue-chip stocks are included in the index.

Like its progenitor, the Dow Jones Industrial Average (INDU), stocks in The Global Dow are selected by senior editors of The Wall Street Journal. Joining them for this new index were Dow Jones Newswires senior editors in the three major regions of the globe. The Global Dow is bigger—150 stocks rather than 30—and its components are weighted equally rather than by price. All 30 Dow industrial stocks are included, as well as some from the Dow Jones Transportation and Utility averages.

The Global Dow tracks leading companies from around the world in all industries, selected not just for current size and reputation but also for their potential. It covers both developed and emerging markets. In addition, it includes companies from emerging sectors, such as alternative energy. The components are equally weighted, which means that price movements of the larger stocks have no greater impact on index performance than those of the smaller stocks.
 
The Global Dow is calculated and disseminated in real time by Dow Jones Indexes. Current and closing values can be accessed daily in The Wall Street Journal, and real time at www.djindexes.com . The Base Value is 1000 as of December 31, 2000.

The Global Dow (GDOW) components 

 3M
 ABB
 Abbott Laboratories
 Alcoa
 Allianz
 Amazon
 América Móvil
 Amgen
 American Express
 Anglo American plc
 Anheuser-Busch InBev
 Apple
 ArcelorMittal
 Assicurazioni Generali
 AstraZeneca
 AT&T
 BAE Systems
 Banco Bilbao Vizcaya Argentaria
 Banco Santander
 Bank of America
 Bank of New York Mellon
 BASF
 Baxter International
 Bharti Airtel
 BHP
 BNP Paribas
 Boeing
 Bridgestone
 BP
 Canon
 Carnival Corporation & plc
 Carrefour
 Caterpillar
 Chevron Corporation
 China Construction Bank
 China Mobile
 China Petroleum & Chemical
 China Unicom
 Cisco Systems
 CLP Holdings
 The Coca-Cola Company
 Colgate-Palmolive
 Compagnie de Saint-Gobain
 CEMIG
 Companhia Vale do Rio Doce Pref A
 ConocoPhillips
 Credit Suisse Group
 Daimler AG
 Deere & Co
 Deutsche Bank
 DuPont
 E.ON
 eBay
 EDP-Energias de Portugal
 Ericsson
 ExxonMobil
 FedEx
 Esprit Holdings
 First Solar
 Freeport-McMoRan
 Gazprom
 GDF Suez
 General Electric
 Gilead Sciences
 GlaxoSmithKline
 Goldman Sachs
 Google
 Hanwha Q Cells
 Hewlett-Packard
 Home Depot
 Honda
 Honeywell
 HSBC(UK registered)
 Hutchison Whampoa
 IBM
 Industrial & Commercial Bank of China
 Infosys
 Johnson & Johnson
 JPMorgan Chase
 Komatsu
 Kraft Foods
 LG Electronics
 LVMH
 McDonald's
 Medtronic
 Merck & Co
 Medco Health Solutions
 Microsoft
 Mitsubishi Corporation
 Mitsubishi UFJ Financial Group
 Mitsui & Co
 Mizuho Financial Group
 Monsanto Company
 Nasdaq
 National Australia Bank
 National Grid plc
 Nestle
 News Corp Cl A
 Nike Cl B
 Nintendo
 Nippon Steel
 Nokia
 Novartis
 Panasonic
 PetroChina
 Petroleo Brasileiro S/A Pref
 Pfizer
 Philip Morris International
 PotashCorp
 Procter & Gamble
 Reliance Industries
 Renewable Energy Corporation
 Rio Tinto
 Roche Holding AG Part. Cert.
 Royal Bank of Canada
 Royal Dutch Shell A
 Samsung
 SAP
 Schlumberger
 Seven & I Holdings
 Siemens
 Société Générale
 Sony
 Southwest Airlines
 SunPower Corp. Cl A
 Suntech Power Holdings
 TSMC
 Takeda Pharmaceutical Company
 Tata Steel
 Telefónica
 Tesco
 Time Warner
 Toshiba
 TotalEnergies
 Toyota 
 Travelers
 UBS
 UniCredit
 United Parcel Service Cl B
 United Technologies
 Veolia Environnement
 Verizon Communications
 Vestas
 Vinci
 Visa Cl A
 Vodafone
 Wal-Mart Stores
 Walt Disney Company

Country allocation

Sector allocation

See also
BBC Global 30
MSCI World
S&P Global 100
S&P Global 1200

External links 
 The Global Dow

Global stock market indices
Dow Jones & Company